MT-RNR2-like 8 is a protein in humans that is encoded by the MTRNR2L8 gene.

References

Further reading 

Genes on human chromosome 11